Daniel Dion O'Brien (born July 18, 1966) is an American former decathlete and Olympic gold medalist. He won the Olympic title in 1996, three consecutive world championships (1991, 1993, 1995), and set the world record in 1992.

Early life 
O'Brien was born in Portland, Oregon in 1966. He is of African American and Finnish heritage, and grew up as an adopted child in an Irish-American family in Klamath Falls.  He attended Henley High School graduating in 1984. At the Oregon High School State Championships he led his team to a team runner-up finish with O'Brien scoring all points. He earned four individual gold medals winning the 110 meter high hurdles, 300 meter hurdles, long jump and 100 yard dash. He then attended the University of Idaho in Moscow, where he competed in track and field for the Vandals. After initially flunking out of the university and then incurring legal difficulties, O'Brien attended Spokane Falls Community College, a community college in Spokane, Washington in 1987-1988. He returned to the UI to compete for the Vandal track  and complete his bachelor's 

O'Brien trained for his Olympic and world championships on the Palouse under Idaho's track coach Mike Keller, and Rick Sloan of Washington State in neighboring Pullman for the field 

O'Brien competed at the U.S. Olympic Trials in 1988; after a fast time in the 100 meters, he was injured in the long jump and withdrew. He took second place at the Goodwill Games in Seattle in 1990, behind Dave Johnson.

Career

Olympics
As the 1991 world champion, O'Brien entered the Olympic year of 1992 as the favorite to win gold in the decathlon in Barcelona and be proclaimed as the "world's greatest athlete." However, during the U.S. Olympic Trials at Tad Gormley Stadium in New Orleans in late June, O'Brien had a disaster in the eighth event, the pole vault. As a result, he scored no points and dropped from first to eleventh place among the 24 decathletes. He did not make the Olympic team for Barcelona, but he continued to train for the competition held in France a few weeks after the Olympics ended.

O'Brien's "no height" in the pole vault was also a financial embarrassment for his main corporate sponsor, and for NBC television which was heavily promoting the upcoming Olympics.  He appeared with U.S. rival Dave Johnson, the Goodwill Games champion, in a popular TV advertising campaign for Reebok. The series of commercials, entitled "Dan & Dave," were meant to build interest in Reebok and the decathletes, culminating in the Olympics in Barcelona. O'Brien's unexpected failure in New Orleans received considerable attention; Reebok adjusted by running new ads featuring him cheering on Dave, who went on to win the bronze medal.

O'Brien regrouped and set a world record of 8,891 points in early September in Talence, France. His marks were as follows: 100 meters in 10.43 seconds (with a tailwind); Long Jump 26 ft 6¼ in (8.08 m); Shot Put 54 ft 9¼ in (16.69 m); High Jump 6 ft 9½ in (2.07 m); 400 meters 48.51 seconds, for a first day total of 4,720 points; Day two 110 Meter High Hurdles in 13.98 seconds; Discus 159 ft 4 inches (48.56m); Pole Vault 16 ft 4¾ in  (5.00 m); Javelin 205 ft 4 in (62.58m); 1,500 meter run in 4 minutes 42.10 seconds = total 8,891 points).

This stood as the world record until 1999, and the American record for nearly twenty years, until Ashton Eaton broke it in 2012 at the U.S. Olympic Trials in Eugene, Oregon. O'Brien was in attendance at Hayward Field and congratulated Eaton shortly after he completed the 1500 meters for a new world record of 9,039 points.

At the Olympics in Atlanta in 1996, O'Brien won the gold medal with 8,824 points, 118 ahead of runner-up Frank Busemann of Germany. After a break from competition, he won the Goodwill Games title in 1998, held east of New York City on Long Island, his eleventh consecutive win since 1992. A plantar fascia injury to his left foot in July 2000, shortly before the U.S. Olympic Trials, caused his withdrawal and he did not defend his title. Injuries continued and prevented his return to the Olympic trials in 2004.

Other athletics
O'Brien broke the world record for the fastest game of hopscotch on Chelsea Piers on May 7, 2009. He established a record of 81 seconds, breaking the old mark by two seconds.

Shortly following the 2010 MLB season, O'Brien began working with San Francisco Giants third baseman Pablo Sandoval, in an effort to help the struggling slugger lose weight.

Modeling/Product endorsements
In the late 1990s, Dan O'Brien appeared in ads for Italian designer Versace.

Literature
On June 1, 2012, O'Brien released a book which was co-written with Brad Botkin, "Clearing Hurdles: The Quest to Be The World's Greatest Athlete".

Podcast 
O'Brien and Dave Johnson are the subject of (and participants in) the ESPN Radio 30 for 30 podcast "The Trials of Dave and Dan"

Personal life
O'Brien has been a resident of the Phoenix area since 1997, relocating from northern Idaho. He owns Gold Medal Acceleration, a gym in Scottsdale, is a volunteer track coach at ASU, and does commentary for track and field events on television.

Honors and awards
O'Brien won the Olympic gold medal for decathlon at the 1996 Summer Olympics in Atlanta, and also won gold medals at the 1991, 1993, and 1995 World Championships in Athletics.

Shortly after his gold medal performance at the 1996 Olympics, O'Brien was honored with "Dan O'Brien Day" by the state of Idaho and a parade by the city of Moscow in mid-August.

O'Brien was inducted into the Oregon Sports Hall of Fame in 2005, along with Dave Johnson.  He was inducted into the National Track and Field Hall of Fame in 2006, the University of Idaho Sports Hall of Fame with the large inaugural class of 2007, and the United States Olympic Hall of Fame in 2012.

A street in Klamath Falls was named for him 1996, and Henley High School honored O'Brien by renaming its football field after the athlete in 2010.

The University of Idaho's outdoor track and field venue was named for O'Brien in 1996.  The complex underwent a $2.5 million renovation in 2011–12, and he was on hand in Moscow in May 2012 to rededicate it.

See also

References

External links

 
 U.S. Olympic Hall of Fame – Dan O'Brien
 University of Idaho – Vandal Athletics Hall of Fame – Dan O'Brien
 USA Track & Field  – Dan O'Brien
 Big Sky Conference – Dan O'Brien

 A "Dan & Dave" reunion - The Portland Tribune - 07-Oct-2005
 Biggest sports busts -- ESPN Page 2

Video
YouTube – Reebok Commercials - Dan and Dave - 1992  
YouTube – World Record, from French television broadcast (1992)
FloTrack.org – Dan O'Brien reflects (2012)

1966 births
Living people
African-American male track and field athletes
American male decathletes
Athletes (track and field) at the 1996 Summer Olympics
American people of Finnish descent
Track and field athletes from Idaho
People from Klamath Falls, Oregon
Idaho Vandals men's track and field athletes
American adoptees
Olympic gold medalists for the United States in track and field
World Athletics Championships medalists
Medalists at the 1996 Summer Olympics
Track and field athletes from Portland, Oregon
Goodwill Games medalists in athletics
Arizona State Sun Devils track and field coaches
World Athletics Championships winners
World Athletics Indoor Championships winners
Competitors at the 1998 Goodwill Games
Competitors at the 1990 Goodwill Games
Competitors at the 1994 Goodwill Games
21st-century African-American people
20th-century African-American sportspeople